Italian composer Domenico Scarlatti (1685–1757) wrote 555 solo keyboard sonatas throughout his career. Circulated irregularly in his lifetime, these are now recognized as a significant contribution which pushed the musical and technical standards of keyboard music.

Editions
This lists the sonatas for solo keyboard (originally intended for harpsichord, clavichord, or fortepiano) by Domenico Scarlatti. The list can be sorted by any of the four sets of catalogue numbers:
 K: Ralph Kirkpatrick (1953; sometimes Kk. or Kp.)
 L: Alessandro Longo (1906)
 P: Giorgio Pestelli (1967)
 CZ: Carl Czerny

Solo keyboard sonatas

See: Yanez Navarro, Celestino: Nuevas aportaciones para el estudio de las sonatas de Domenico Scarlatti. Los manuscritos del Archivo de música de las Catedrales de Zaragoza. Tesis doctoral, Universidad Autónoma de Barcelona, 2015.

References

Notes

Citations

Sources

External links
Domenico Scarlatti: The Keyboard Sonatas – Lists at Classical.net, sorted by Longo, Kirkpatrick or Pestelli numbers or key, time signature
Scarlatti Domenico: Catalogue; lists original sources for more than 600 keyboard sonatas including many not listed in this article; newly discovered ones and doubtful ones; other lists such as Fadini's edition. That link is now broken. The author died on  June 17, 2014. Archived copy of the final May 30, 2014 revision is available here: https://web.archive.org/web/20140914095212/http://chrishail.net/catalogue.pdf Scarlatti Domenico: Catalogue]
 Scarlatti: Complete Keyboard Sonatas including a list of all beginnings as sheet music (PDF)
 An iTunes playlist of Scarlatti Sonata recordings (Select columns from Name to the right, Copy, Open a plain text editor, Paste, Save, Open iTunes, File > Library > Import Playlist)
 

 
Compositions for keyboard
Compositions for harpsichord
Sonatas